The Wesley Marsh House is a historic house in rural northern White County, Arkansas. It is a -story wood-frame structure, with a side-gable roof that descends on one side to a shed-roofed porch. The exterior is clad in board-and-batten siding, and the foundation consists of stone piers. Built about 1900, it is one of the county's few surviving houses from the period.

The house was listed on the National Register of Historic Places in 1992.

See also
National Register of Historic Places listings in White County, Arkansas

References

Houses on the National Register of Historic Places in Arkansas
Houses in White County, Arkansas
National Register of Historic Places in White County, Arkansas
Unused buildings in Arkansas
Houses completed in 1900
1900 establishments in Arkansas